Socotrella is a monotypic genus of plant in family Apocynaceae. It contains the single species Socotrella dolichocnema.

References

Bruyns, P. V. and A. G. Miller. (2002). Socotrella, a new genus of stapeliad (Apocynaceae-Asclepiadoideae) from the island of Socotra. Novon 12:3 330–333.

Asclepiadoideae
Vulnerable plants
Taxonomy articles created by Polbot
Monotypic Apocynaceae genera